Planet of the Daleks is the fourth serial of the tenth season of the British science fiction television series Doctor Who, which was first broadcast in six weekly parts on BBC1 from 7 April to 12 May 1973.

Continuing from the events of the serial Frontier in Space, the story involves a small team of Daleks plotting to revive an army of Daleks which are being kept in suspended animation on the planet Spiridon.

Plot

The Third Doctor has been wounded after being shot by the Master. Jo helps the Doctor into the TARDIS, where he sends a message to the Time Lords before he collapses then falls into a coma. Jo dictates into the TARDIS log that she has seen this healing state before (The Dæmons), and that the TARDIS is moving, being controlled remotely by the Time Lords. When the TARDIS stops Jo activates the external scanners to see some plants outside block the viewer by spraying a thick sap-like liquid at it. With the Doctor still catatonic, Jo leaves to explore the surrounding jungle. The plants spray sap on her as she walks by, and a bit of it gets on her hand.

As Jo explores, the TARDIS is rapidly covered by plant sap, which is hardening into a shell around it. When the Doctor awakens, he finds himself sealed in and the oxygen in the TARDIS rapidly being used up. Activating the emergency oxygen supply, he discovers the tanks almost empty, and starts to suffocate from lack of air. Jo discovers a spacecraft in the jungle with a dead pilot. Shortly after, three blonde haired humanoids enter the spacecraft, identifying themselves as Taron, Vaber and Codal. They offer help but are cautious as there is an apparent danger outside.

Taron and his men find the TARDIS and chip the hardened sap from its doors, then drag a nearly asphyxiated Doctor out. The Doctor thanks them and notes that he finds them familiar. When the men explain that they are from the planet Skaro, the Doctor recognises that they are Thals and tells them he was on Skaro many years ago with his three companions, Susan, Ian and Barbara (The Daleks).

Meanwhile, Jo has fallen unconscious as a result of the plant sap and is removed from the spacecraft by a Spiridon, an invisible apparently humanoid lifeform. Whilst en route to the Thal spacecraft the Doctor and the Thals encounter an apparently disabled Dalek that has the power of invisibility. After examining it they return to the Thal spacecraft to discover the Daleks have already found it. The Doctor, still believing that Jo is on board, reveals himself to the Daleks, only to be disabled and the spacecraft destroyed anyway.

The Doctor is taken to the Dalek base for interrogation and is put in the same cell as the recently captured Codal. The Doctor tries to use his sonic screwdriver to open the cell door, but to no avail. He and Codal then conceive of modifying the components of the TARDIS log to emit a radio frequency that will jam Dalek control impulses. Meanwhile, Jo is being cared for by the Spiridon who found her, Wester, who is one of a group of his people trying to fight back against the Daleks. He cures Jo of her fungal infection with a salve, and tells Jo that the Doctor and Codal have been captured and taken to the Dalek base. Jo is determined to try to free them, even though Wester says that if the Daleks use them for their experiments, they are better off dead.

Meanwhile, a Thal spacecraft crashes on the planet's surface, containing a small relief force sent to warn the first group that, rather than the small scientific expedition earlier intelligence had indicated, there are, in fact, close to 10,000 Daleks in the base.  Among the survivors of the crash are Rebec and Latep; Taron is romantically involved with Rebec, and had gone to some lengths to keep her off the first expedition list.

Having escaped their cell by using the device on one of the Daleks, the Doctor and Codal encounter Rebec and Taron, who had been mounting a rescue operation, and they flee with the Daleks pursuing them.  They make their way to a refrigeration chamber and discover the hibernating Dalek army.  With the Daleks cutting their way through the door into the chamber, the Doctor improvises a hot-air balloon and the group escape up a shaft to the surface.  Codal and Rebec heave a boulder down the shaft, destroying a pursuing Dalek, and they narrowly avoid a second patrol sent from the surface.  They reunite with Latep and Vaber, who is keen to attack the Daleks as soon as possible, while Taron urges caution.

Meanwhile, the Daleks have found a map dropped by one of the Thals showing the location of their explosive stash, and they send a patrol to detonate them.  Jo, having tracked them there from the base, resets the denotation timers on two of the units, but is knocked out by falling rocks while resetting the third.  She comes to as a second patrol arrives, and hides with the reset units as the third destroys the patrol.  Jo finds the Thals—and the Doctor, who is overjoyed to learn she wasn't killed earlier—and has an instant connection with Latep. Codal reasons that the refrigeration chamber must be necessary to whatever plans the Daleks have on Spiridon. The impulsive Vaber urges an assault on the Dalek base to destroy the refrigeration device and confronts Taron over his cautious approach.  He backs down, but then leaves the group in the middle of the night, taking the explosives with him.  When Taron tells him what Vaber plans to do, the Doctor realizes this will wake the Dalek army from its hibernation.

Back at the base, the Dalek Section Leader has developed a colony of bacteria which, when released, will wipe out all organic life on Spiridon.  All that remains is to immunise the Daleks and the Spiridon slave workers from its effects.  Wester arrives at the Thal camp and tells them about the bacteria.  The group plan to infiltrate the base by disguising themselves as Spiridons—easy enough to do, as the otherwise-invisible Spiridons wear purple furs that cover them from head to toe.  However, they'll also need a Dalek shell for the necessary escort.  Having obtained a couple of furs, Taron and Codal join a Dalek patrol.  Vaber, meanwhile, has been captured by the Spiridons and delivered to the patrol for interrogation.  Rather than reveal the location of the remaining Thals, Vaber makes a break for it and is gunned down by the Daleks.  Taron and Codal then retrieve the captured explosives and return to camp.  Jo and Latep then lure two Daleks into an ambush at a lake of molten ice; the shock of the lake temperature is enough to kill the Daleks, giving the group the last piece of the plan.

The Doctor has devised a two-pronged assault—he, Taron, and Codal will go in the front door in the Spiridon disguises, accompanied by Rebec in the Dalek shell, and try to find their way to the cooling chamber.  Meanwhile, Joe and Latep will go in through the ice tunnels and attempt to rendezvous with them.  Meanwhile, Wester enters the base on the pretext of sharing information on the whereabouts of the Thals, and is shown to the control room.  There, he realizes the Daleks' preparations are incomplete, and opens the bacteria chamber, which kills him instantly.  The control room goes into automatic lockdown, sealing two Daleks inside forever, and foiling their plans for the bacteria.

The Doctor's ruse is exposed when a Dalek spots Taron's feet under the Spiridon furs, and they pursue the group into the base.  Finally, the Doctor and the Thals get away, making their way back to the cooling chamber. Once there, the Doctor asks Rebec and Taron to barricade the entrance while he finds a way to keep the Dalek army from reviving. He and Codal decide to set an explosive in the wall of the chamber containing the Dalek army, which is slowly coming to life. In the meantime, the Dalek Supreme, a member of the Dalek Supreme Council, has arrived in a spaceship, to oversee the final stages of the operation, and exterminates the Section Leader for its incompetence.

Jo and Latep arrive at the cooling chamber and use their bomb to destroy a squad of Daleks before joining the others. As another patrol comes through, the bomb set in the chamber wall explodes. Molten ice rushes out to flood the chamber, freezing the Dalek army. The group escapes over a ramp that leads to the surface while the rest of the Daleks abandon the base, which is filling with molten ice.

The group makes its way to the Dalek Supreme's spacecraft. The Doctor asks Taron not to glorify what has happened, nor make war sound like an adventure. The Thals were a peaceful people and he would not want that to change. Taron and Rebec promise and the Thals enter the spacecraft and leave for Skaro. The Doctor and Jo run back to the TARDIS, pursued by the Dalek Supreme and the other Daleks. They dematerialise just as the Daleks open fire. The Dalek Supreme orders operations to recover the invasion force and contact the Dalek High Council for a rescue ship.

Production
The story was originally commissioned as Planet of the Daleks, but during production it briefly changed to Destination: Daleks. Episodes 2 & 4 do not feature a reprise of the previous episode's cliffhanger ending, while the reprises in Episodes 3 and 5 are re-performances. Though this latter technique was commonplace in 1960s episodes, by this time in the programme's history it was an approach almost never used.

The Dalek Supreme in this story was a modified prop from the film Daleks' Invasion Earth 2150 A.D. (1966) that had been given to Terry Nation. Its eyestalk has been replaced with a conventional torch, which flashes when it speaks.

For many years Episode 3 of the serial existed in the BBC Archives only as a black-and-white 16mm telerecording, as the 625-line colour PAL transmission master videotape for that episode was wiped for reuse by the BBC in 1976. Episode 3 was restored to full colour in 2008, using a combination of computer colourisation by Legend Films with software developed by the Colour Recovery Working Group. This version was released on DVD in 2009. The colour masters for the other five episodes are still extant.

Cast notes
Bernard Horsfall had previously appeared as Lemuel Gulliver in The Mind Robber (1968) and as the First Time Lord in The War Games (1969). He appeared once more in The Deadly Assassin (1976), as Chancellor Goth. All these serials were directed by David Maloney.

Prentis Hancock had appeared as a reporter in Spearhead from Space (1970), and would return as Salamar in Planet of Evil (1975) and as the Shrieve Captain in The Ribos Operation (1978).

Broadcast and reception

The serial was repeated on BBC One on Friday evenings between 5 November and 17 December 1993, as part of "Doctor Who and the Daleks", celebrating 30 years of Doctor Who. Each episode was preceded by a specially made 5 min vignette, which were 'Bigger on the Inside', 'The Antique Doctor Who Roadshow', 'Missing in Action', 'I Was That Monster', 'The Master' and 'U.N.I.T. Recruitment Film'. The repeat of Episode 3 of Planet of the Daleks on 19 November 1993 was shown in black and white, the only time since June 1969 that a Doctor Who episode has been broadcast in black and white on BBC One. The ratings achieved were 3.6, 4.0, 3.9, 3.3, 3.3 & 3.5 million viewers respectively.

Paul Cornell, Martin Day, and Keith Topping gave an unfavourable review of the serial in The Discontinuity Guide (1995), writing that it was "a typical coincidence-based Dalek story of hammy deaths and ridiculous escapes. A reworking of the themes and set pieces of The Daleks, with pacifism and an anti-nuclear stance becoming weak monologues on bravery and caution." In 2010, Mark Braxton of Radio Times awarded it three stars out of five, describing Planet of the Daleks as "an exciting story, but a tawdry spectacle" with it being "continually compromised" in production values. While he found that some elements of the story were enjoyable, he felt that it lacked emotional continuity and the Daleks did not impress. DVD Talk's John Sinnott found the story more enjoyable than Frontier in Space, praising the way Nation "filled the plot with creative other-worldly creatures and devices and used them nicely to move the story". In the book Doctor Who: The Episode Guide, Mark Campbell also rated it as better than Frontier in Space, awarding it eight out of ten, concluding "a believable jungle setting and ambitious (if unoriginal) ideas make this live-action comic strip romp breeze along in fine style."

Commercial releases

In print

A novelisation of this serial, written by Terrance Dicks, was published by Target Books in October 1976. The novelisation opens with the cliffhanger from Frontier in Space of a comatose Doctor pursuing the Daleks through space, even though this was removed from the Space War novelisation.  A German translation was published in 1980.

In 1995 an abridged version of the novel was issued by BBC Audio as an audio book, read by Jon Pertwee. It was later reissued on the MP3-CD release Tales from the TARDIS Volume 2.  An unedited audio book version was released in June 2013, narrated by actor and writer Mark Gatiss, with Dalek voices performed by Nicholas Briggs.

Home media
This story, together with Revelation of the Daleks was released on VHS in a special Dalek tin set in 1999, with episode 3 in black and white. The stories were released on VHS individually in North America. It was released on DVD alongside the previous story, Frontier in Space, in the box set "Dalek War" on 5 October 2009, with episode 3 now restored to full colour using the pioneering chroma dot recovery process and some more traditional colourisation techniques. In July 2019 the story was released for the first time on Blu-ray as part of the Season 10 boxset. It featured optional updated visual effects and 5.1 Surround Sound. In November 2020, it was released as part of the Time Lord Victorious: Road to the Dark Times blu-ray set along with Genesis of the Daleks, The Deadly Assassin. State of Decay, The Curse of Fenric, The Runaway Bride and The Waters of Mars.

Notes

References

External links

 Restoration Team Website – Dalek War DVD boxset

Target novelisation

Third Doctor serials
Dalek television stories
Doctor Who serials novelised by Terrance Dicks
Television episodes written by Terry Nation
Fiction set in the 26th century